The Serenade No. 6 for Orchestra in D major K. 239, Serenata notturna, was written by Wolfgang Amadeus Mozart in Salzburg, in 1776.  Mozart's father, Leopold Mozart, wrote the title and a January 1776 date on the original manuscript.

It has three movements.

It is scored for

Two small orchestras 
1st violin (soloist), 2nd violin (soloist), 1st viola, double bass
1st violin, 2nd violin, 2nd viola, cello, timpani.

The title Serenata notturna has also been used by Robin Holloway for a work for four horns and orchestra (his opus 52, 1982).

References

External links

Performance of Serenade No. 6 by A Far Cry from the Isabella Stewart Gardner Museum in MP3 format

Serenade 06
Compositions in D major
1776 compositions